Gymnochiromyia is a genus of flies belonging to the family Chyromyidae.

The genus has almost cosmopolitan distribution.

Species:

Gymnochiromyia concolor 
Gymnochiromyia dubia 
Gymnochiromyia fallax 
Gymnochiromyia flavella 
Gymnochiromyia fulvipyga 
Gymnochiromyia hawaiiensis 
Gymnochiromyia homobifida 
Gymnochiromyia inermis 
Gymnochiromyia mihalyii 
Gymnochiromyia nigridorsum 
Gymnochiromyia nigrimana 
Gymnochiromyia punctata 
Gymnochiromyia seminitens 
Gymnochiromyia sexspinosa 
Gymnochiromyia tschirnhausi 
Gymnochiromyia zernyi

References

Chyromyidae
Brachycera genera